Frédéric Nérac (1960 – unknown, declared dead 21 October 2005) was a French journalist, reported missing in Iraq since 22 March 2003. On 21 October 2005 he was officially declared dead in absentia, though no body has been found.

Background
Frédéric Nérac was covering the Invasion of Iraq for the UK-based ITN television network as an unembedded journalist, as opposed to journalists "embedded" with US or UK military units.

On 22 March 2003, in Bassora, two ITN vehicles were captured in crossfire between US and Iraqi forces. One of the vehicles, carrying Terry Lloyd and Daniel Demoustier, was destroyed. The second vehicle, carrying Nérac, apparently managed to escape to cover, and disappeared. British forces and French officials investigated the area; US authorities were reported to be unhelpful in the search.

On 21 October 2005, Nérac was declared dead by the French Ministry of Foreign Affairs. In 2006, citing an anonymous diplomatic source, Georges Malbrunot said that he believed that Nérac had been executed by Ba'athists and buried in the Az Zubayr cemetery.

See also 
List of people who disappeared

References

External links
 Web site about the disappearance of Frédéric Nérac (Photographs)
Eighteen months after Fred Nérac went missing in Iraq, Reporters Without Borders urges the UK to hand its inquiry report to the family and French authorities, Reporters sans frontières.
Two Missing ITV Journalists Were Killed By US Troops, by Tom Newton Dunn, The Mirror.
Incident Account by Daniel Demoustier

1960 births
2000s missing person cases
2005 deaths
French male non-fiction writers
French reporters and correspondents
Journalists killed while covering the Iraq War
Missing person cases in Iraq
People declared dead in absentia